Nick Nemeroff (December 28, 1989 – June 27, 2022) was a Canadian stand-up comedian. He was most noted for his 2020 comedy album The Pursuit of Comedy Has Ruined My Life, which was a Juno Award nominee for Comedy Album of the Year at the Juno Awards of 2021.

Career 
Originally from Montreal, Quebec, Nemeroff appeared on Conan and on The Comedy Network's 2018 Homegrown Comics special, and has performed at Just for Laughs, the Winnipeg Comedy Festival, and the Halifax Comedy Festival. He was a Canadian Comedy Award nominee for Best Breakout Artist at the 18th Canadian Comedy Awards in 2018.

In 2022, he appeared in the CBC Gem web series The New Wave of Standup, and in two episodes of Roast Battle Canada.

On June 27, 2022, Nemeroff died at the age of 32. The news, which was confirmed by his family and management company in statements posted to social media, did not detail his cause of death, but his manager, Morgan Flood, indicated in a text message to CBC that he "died in his sleep."

References

External links

1989 births
2022 deaths
21st-century Canadian comedians
Canadian male comedians
Canadian stand-up comedians
Comedians from Montreal
Jewish Canadian comedians
Place of death missing